Steppenwolf was a Canadian-American hard rock band from Los Angeles, California. Formed in 1967, the group originally consisted of lead vocalist and rhythm guitarist John Kay, lead guitarist Michael Monarch, bassist Rushton Moreve, drummer Jerry Edmonton and keyboardist Goldy McJohn. The band's final lineup featured Kay, keyboardist Michael Wilk (since 1982, and bassist between 1984 and 2009), bassist Gary Link (from 1982 to 1984, and since 2009), drummer Ron Hurst (since 1984) and lead guitarist Danny Johnson (since 1996).

History

1967–1976
Steppenwolf evolved from the Sparrows in late 1967 and originally included John Kay, Michael Monarch, Rushton Moreve, Jerry Edmonton and Goldy McJohn. After the release of two studio albums, Moreve was fired in early 1969 for failure to appear at several performances, with former Sparrows bassist Nick St. Nicholas taking his place. Monarch left the group in August, with Larry Byrom taking his place in time for the recording of Monster. St. Nicholas ceased working with Steppenwolf in April 1970, and was formally excluded from the band the following year. He was replaced by George Biondo. Byrom was replaced by Kent Henry for the 1971 release For Ladies Only. In February 1972, Steppenwolf disbanded; Kay, Henry and Biondo continued working together, while Edmonton and McJohn formed a group called Manbeast.

In early 1974 Steppenwolf reformed, with guitarist Bobby Cochran joining returning members Kay, Biondo, Edmonton and McJohn. Kay fired McJohn the following February, with Andy Chapin taking his place. The new keyboardist declined to tour with the group, however, and was replaced by Wayne Cook. The band released three studio albums during its second tenure, before disbanding in late 1976. Following the group's second breakup, former members St. Nicholas and McJohn formed a band dubbed "New Steppenwolf", it was licensed and legit until 1980 at which time the licensing agreement wasn't complied with prompting Kay and Edmonton (who owned the rights to use the name) to take legal action.

1980–2018
Kay reformed the band as "John Kay and Steppenwolf" in January 1980, rebuilding the group with brothers Michael (lead guitar) and Steve Palmer (drums), bassist Kurtis Teel and keyboardist Danny Ironstone (Teel and Ironstone were soon replaced by Chad Peery and Brett Tuggle, respectively). Peery and Tuggle performed on the 1981 live album Live in London, but were replaced for the recording of the following year's studio return Wolftracks by Welton Gite and Michael Wilk, respectively. Gary Link took over on bass for 1984's Paradox but had left alongside the Palmer brothers by the end of the year, with Rocket Ritchotte (lead guitar) and Ron Hurst (drums) joining shortly after, and keyboardist Michael Wilk took the bass. The band released Rock & Roll Rebels in 1987, which was the group's first to feature the four-piece lineup.

Ritchotte left Steppenwolf in 1989 to tour with the David Lee Roth Band, returning the following year and remaining until late 1993. During his time away from the band, he was replaced briefly by Les Dudek, and later by Steve Fister. Following his departure, Fister returned to Steppenwolf for another three-year run. In 1996, Danny Johnson joined Steppenwolf in place of the departed Fister. Bassist Gary Link rejoined the band in 2009. In October 2018, at the end of the band's 50th anniversary tour, Kay announced that the group had officially retired.

Members

Timeline

Lineups

References

External links
Steppenwolf official website

Steppenwolf